Elías Bechara Zainúm (December 10, 1920 – August 9, 2013) was a Colombian educator, philanthropist and chemist-bacteriologist, founder of the University of Córdoba and the University of Sinú, in Colombia.

Early life
Zainúm was the son of Syrian-Lebanese migrants who arrived in Colombia towards the end of the 19th century and the beginning of the 20th century, settling in Lorica, Córdoba. As a child, Zainúm was a great reader and always wanted to help and protect his classmates. Zainúm moved to Cartagena for high school.

Chemistry career
He studied chemistry at the University of Cartagena and specialized in Biochemistry and Laboratory in Mexico and Texas.

He returned to Colombia and settled in the city of Barranquilla where he was a teacher at the Universidad del Atlántico, alternating his time with research and the laboratory. He patented the delayed formula of Penicillin (Pensolvox), acquired by the Own Laboratory of Colombia for its distribution.

Based in Montería, he wanted to contribute to the development of the region, and in 1962, he founded the Lorica Agricultural Institute, ITA.

In 1964, he created the first university in the region: the National University of Córdoba, of which he was founder and twice Rector. In 1965 in Montería, he created the first departmental night high school on the Atlantic Coast.

He supports the opening of INEM Lorenzo María Lleras, providing the land for its construction. Likewise, he supports the creation of the Cecilia de Lleras School and the approval of the José María Córdoba National School.

University of Sinú
In 1974 he founded the Higher Educational Corporation of Córdoba (Cesco), which in 1980 became the Sinú University Corporation and in 2004, through Resolution No. 4973 of the Ministry of National Education (MEN), obtained recognition as a university, calling itself since then Universidad del Sinú -Elías Bechara Zainúm-,1 Institution since 2019 is Accredited in High Quality by the MEN (Ministry of National Education).

Elías Bechara Zainúm held important local, regional and national positions, among which are: Mayor of Montería, Senator of the Republic and councilor of the municipalities of Montería, Cereté and Los Córdobas. He was the first regional president of SENA; first President of Public Improvements; President of the Association of Higher Education Institutions of the Atlantic Coast; President of the Board of the Hospital San Jerónimo de Montería; first President of the Cotton Growers Association of Córdoba; first President of the Urrá Project.

References 

Colombian educators
2013 deaths
1920 births
University of Cartagena alumni
People from Córdoba Department
Rectors of universities and colleges in Colombia